Orville Edward Jorgens (June 4, 1908 – January 11, 1992) was a Major League Baseball pitcher. Jorgens played for the Philadelphia Phillies from 1935 to 1937. He batted and threw right-handed. Jorgens was the brother of fellow Major Leaguer Art Jorgens.

In 3 MLB seasons, Jorgens compiled a 21–27 win–loss record, striking out 149, and walking 233.

Jorgens was born in Rockford, Illinois, and died in Colorado Springs, Colorado.

References

External links

1908 births
1992 deaths
Sportspeople from Rockford, Illinois
American people of Norwegian descent
Baseball players from Illinois
Philadelphia Phillies players